The High Cathedral of Saint Peter in Trier, or Trier Cathedral, is a Roman Catholic cathedral in Trier, Rhineland-Palatinate, Germany. It is the oldest church in Germany and the largest religious structure in Trier, notable for its long life span and grand design. The central part of the nave was built of Roman brick in the early fourth century, resulting in a cathedral that was added onto gradually in different eras. The imposing Romanesque westwork, with four towers and an additional apse, has been copied repeatedly. The Trier Cathedral Treasury contains an important collection of Christian art. In 1986 the church was listed as a UNESCO World Heritage Site, as part of the Roman Monuments, Cathedral of St. Peter and Church of Our Lady in Trier.

History 
According to certain sources, the cathedral was commissioned by Emperor Constantine the Great and built on top of a palace of Saint Helen, his mother. Following the conversion of Constantine to Christianity, bishop Maximin (329–346) is said to have coordinated the construction of a cathedral, which at the time was the grandest ensemble of ecclesiastical structures in the West outside Rome. On a groundplan four times the size of the present cathedral no less than four basilicas, a baptistry and outbuildings were constructed. Archaeological research confirms that the current cathedral, as well as the adjacent cloisters and Church of Our Lady, is raised upon the foundations of ancient Roman buildings of Augusta Treverorum. The four piers of the crossing of the present church, as well as parts of the brick outer walls are remnants from this period.

The fourth-century church was left in ruins by the Franks but rebuilt. It was destroyed again by the Vikings in 882. Under Archbishop Egbert (d. 993) rebuilding started, completed by Poppo of Babenberg (1016–1041). The famous west façade dates from this period, although the apse was not finished until 1196. Throughout the centuries the church continued to be rebuilt and embellished, according to the fashion of the period with Gothic vaults, Renaissance sculptures and Baroque chapels, but the overall style of the building remains Romanesque with a Roman core.

Description

Exterior 
Large sections of Roman brickwork are visible on the north façade. The imposing westwork of Trier Cathedral consist of five symmetrical sections and is typical of Romanesque architecture under the Salian emperors (11th century). The westwork was started by Poppo von Babenberg (1010–47) and completed by Eberhard (1047–66). Its four towers are more or less symmetrically placed on both sides of the western apse. It served as an example for many other churches in Rhine-Meuse area. The Latin inscription above the clock on the tallest tower reads "NESCITIS QVA HORA DOMINVS VENIET" ("You do not know what time the Lord is coming"). The east choir is less prominent, due to its built-in location and the addition of the Chapel of the Holy Tunic in the early 18th century.

Interior 
The interior measures 112.5 by 41 meter. It consists of three largely Romanesque naves with Gothic vaulting. The original Roman structure is difficult to read on the inside but its basic rectangular form may still be recognized in the three easternmost bays of the nave. The four original columns were reused in the 11th century but changed into cruciform piers. A Baroque chapel for the relic of the Seamless robe of Jesus, recovered from the previous main altar in 1512, was added behind the east choir and is visible through an opening in the wall. The west choir is also decorated in the style of the German Baroque, and so are the chapels of Our Lady and the Holy Sacrament (with the "Golden Gate", part of the former rood screen), and most of the altars in the church. A Romanesque tympanum depicts Christ with the Virgin Mary and Saint Peter. The main church organ appears old but dates from 1974.

Burials 
 Henry I, archbishop of Trier († 964)
 Udo, archbishop of Trier († 1078)
 Baldwin, archbishop of Trier († 1354)
 Bohemond II, archbishop of Trier († 1367)
 Richard von Greiffenklau zu Vollrads, archbishop-elector of Trier († 1531)
 Lothar von Metternich, archbishop-elector of Trier († 1623)
 Johann Hugo von Orsbeck, archbishop-elector of Trier († 1711)
 Franz Georg von Schönborn, archbishop-elector of Trier († 1756)

Treasury and relics 

The Seamless Robe of Jesus, the robe said to have been worn by Jesus shortly before his crucifixion, is the best-known relic of the cathedral. It is kept in an annex chapel and shown to the public infrequently, most recently in 2012. The skull of St. Helena, the mother of Emperor Constantine, is displayed in the east crypt of the cathedral. Her drinking cup is kept in the cathedral's treasury as well as the so-called Egbert Shrine. This is a decorated portable altar that contained the sole of a sandal of St. Andrew and other relics. Another reliquary from the same period contains a Holy Nail from the Cross of Jesus. Both objects are considered highlights of Ottonion goldsmithery.

Cloisters 
The Gothic cloisters were built between 1245 and 1270. They connect the Cathedral and the Liebfrauenkirche. In the western section of the cloisters is a chapel where the cathedral's canons were buried. On the outside wall is a bell from 1682. Adjacent to the cloisters are several annex buildings. The so-called "Romanesque Room" was the former cathedral school. The "Gothic Room" was used for distributing bread to the poor.

See also 
 Roman Monuments, Cathedral of St. Peter and Church of Our Lady in Trier UNESCO World Heritage Site
 Liebfrauenkirche, Trier

References

External links 

 Official Website
 History
 Historic photos
 Music

Trier
Cathedral
World Heritage Sites in Germany
Romanesque architecture in Germany